The Discloser is a 2017 South Korean thriller film directed by Hong Ki-seon. The film stars Kim Sang-kyung, Kim Ok-bin, Choi Moo-sung and Choi Gwi-hwa.

Plot
The story of an investigative reporter and former colonel delving into military secrets to uncover the source of a corruption case.

Cast
Kim Sang-kyung as Park Dae-ik 
Kim Ok-bin as Kim Jung-sook
Choi Moo-sung as Cheon Hyeon-seok
Lee Hang-na as Hee-kyung
Choi Gwi-hwa as Nam Seon-ho
Shin Seung-hwan
Lee Ji-won as Park Shi-won
Choi Go as Young-woo's son
Jung Il-woo as Kang Young-woo
Kwon Han-sol as Bank employee

Production and release
The Discloser was director Hong Ki-seon's fourth and last feature film, and his first film in 8 years. He died of a heart attack in December 2016 at the age of 59 (three days after he finished filming The Discloser).

The Discloser had its world premiere in the "Hong Ki-seon: The Cinema Beyond Suppression" category at the 21st Bucheon International Fantastic Film Festival on July 20, 2017. The film was released in theaters on January 24, 2018.

Reception
Yoon Min-sik of The Korea Herald praised the solid plot and dark and gritty tone of the film, as well as Choi Gwi-ha's performance as the antagonist in the film. Despite following the good versus evil format to some extent, the film hits the audience right on the head with its grounded atmosphere.

Awards and nominations

References

External links

The Discloser at Naver Movies 
The Discloser at Daum 

2017 films
2017 thriller films
South Korean thriller films
Films about corruption
2010s South Korean films